Lyca Productions is an Indian entertainment company, which was established by Subaskaran Allirajah in 2014. A subgroup of Lycamobile, the production studio has been involved in the production and distribution of Tamil films  made in India. It has produced some of Tamil cinema's biggest budget films, such as 2.0 (2018) and Ponniyin Selvan: I (2022).

History
Pirivom Santhippom (2008) was the first film produced by A. Subhaskaran under Gnanam films. Lyca Productions chose to collaborate with Ayngaran International to produce and signed on AR Murugadoss and Vijay to be a part of their debut project. A social drama tackling the issue of farmers committing suicide due to corporate encroachment, Kaththi was shot throughout early 2014 with Samantha and Neil Nitin Mukesh signed on for other pivotal roles. As the film announced its release plans, several pro-Tamil pressure groups demanded all references to Lyca Productions to be removed from the title and other publicity material. The groups felt it was unacceptable that a business house, allegedly reported to be connected to Mahinda Rajapaksa , would be allowed to produce a Tamil movie in Tamil Nadu when the Tamil Nadu Assembly, citing human rights violations during the civil war in the island nation, had already passed a resolution seeking severance of business ties with Sri Lanka. Unable to reach a compromise with the pressure groups, and fearing a boycott and violence, Lyca Productions chose to remove its name from the copies released in India. Kaththi consequently managed to release in October 2014 to positive reviews, with Rediff.com stating that the film "entertains with a message", while Sify.com similarly stated that it was a "well made entertainer with a powerful message". The film became a very profitable venture at the box office for Lyca Productions, grossing over 100 crore rupees within two weeks of release.

In late 2015, Lyca Productions agreed a deal with Dhanush for the worldwide distribution rights of two of his productions, Naanum Rowdydhaan (2015) and Visaranai (2016). The movie was also met with protests, though Naanum Rowdydhaan released without any problems and also became a profitable venture for the studio. Also throughout 2015, Lyca Productions worked on the pre-production of 2.0, a sequel to Shankar's earlier Enthiran (2010), and signed on Rajinikanth and Amy Jackson to feature in key roles. Believed to be the most expensive Indian production of all time, the team also negotiated for several months with Arnold Schwarzenegger for a role in the film, but eventually did not sign him. The studio also launched another film titled Enakku Innoru Per Irukku with G. V. Prakash Kumar in the lead role during December 2015.

Filmography

Production

Distribution 
In addition to the films produced by Lyca Productions since 2014, the following films from other banners were distributed by the company:

Soundtracks

See also
Tamil Cinema
Lycamobile
Lyca Kovai Kings

References

Film distributors of India
Indian companies established in 2014
Film production companies based in Chennai
2014 establishments in Tamil Nadu
Mass media companies established in 2014
Lyca Productions